Tsalka (or) is a town and municipality center in southern Georgia's Kvemo Kartli region.

Population 

The district had a population of 2,326. According to the 2014 census, 47% of its population is Georgian, 38% Armenian, 7%
Caucasus Greeks , and 7% Azerbaijanis. Up until the 1990s, Russian served as the language of inter-ethnic communication and was the language of education in most of the schools in the Tsalka district. It was the only area in the USSR where the Greek language was taught in schools. The population in Tsalka district before 1990 was 55,000 people, and more than 90% Greeks (about 50,000). Before 1990, it was the only city in the USSR with such a high Greek population. There were 49 villages in the district, and 44 were Greek villages. In the past, Greeks used to be the majority of Tsalka, but now their numbers have considerably decreased due to emigration to Greece. Several thousand ethnic Georgians who had suffered from landslides in Svaneti and Adjara were settled in Tsalka in 1997–2006. The settlement of these newcomers sometimes led to ethnic tensions with Tsalka's Greek and Armenian population. According to the 2014 Georgian census, there were only 2,113 Greeks in all of Kvemo Kartli, indicating a further massive drop in numbers of Tsalkan Greeks.

There are important historical monuments in Tsalka: Kldekari Fortress (ninth century) and the church of St. George in Dashbashi (tenth-eleventh centuries). Dashbashi Canyon and its new bridge are also interesting tourist attractions.

Notable people

Vahtang Hakobyan (born 1975), retired football player

See also
Dashbashi Canyon Natural Monument
 Tsalka Urums
 Trialeti petroglyphs

References

Further reading 
 ԾԱԼԿԱՅԻ ՇՐՋԱՆԻ ՀԱՅ ԲՆԱԿՉՈՒԹՅՈՒՆԸ. ԱՆՑՅԱԼԸ, ՆԵՐԿԱՆ ԵՎ ԱՊԱԳԱՆ by Robert Tatoyan

Cities and towns in Kvemo Kartli
Armenian diaspora communities
Pontic Greeks
Tiflis Governorate